Choapa River or El Río Choapa is a river of Chile located in the Coquimbo Region. The river rises in the Andes, at the confluence of the streams Totoral, Leiva and Del Valle. The river then flows through the town of Salamanca before it meets with its main tributary, the Illapel River. The Choapa then empties into the Pacific Ocean in the vicinity of Huentelauquén Cove, about 35 km north of Los Vilos.

The major settlement along the river is Salamanca.

See also
 List of rivers of Chile

References

Rivers of Chile
Rivers of Coquimbo Region